Romano Dazzi (10 February 1905 – 1976) was an Italian artist. He was born in Rome, son of sculptor and painter Arturo Dazzi who taught himself to draw. He was recognized for his artistic prowess at the age of thirteen, drawing war scenes after watching movies. In 1926 he decorated the Aula Magna of the Accademia di Educazione Fisica in Rome. In 1936 he won a silver medal in the art competitions of the Olympic Games for his "Quattro bozzetti per affreschi" ("Four Sketches for Frescoes").

References

External links
 profile

1905 births
1976 deaths
Italian artists
Olympic silver medalists in art competitions
Medalists at the 1936 Summer Olympics
Olympic competitors in art competitions